West Middle School may refer to one of several schools:

 West Middle School (Greenwood Village, Colorado), USA
 West Middle School (Lawrence, Kansas), USA
 West Middle School (Liberal, Kansas), USA
 West Middle School (Columbia, Missouri), USA
 West Middle School (West, Texas), USA
 Fort Zumwalt West Middle School (O'Fallon), USA

See also
 Grand Blanc West Middle School, Michigan, USA
 Julius West Middle School, Rockville, Maryland, USA
 Tri-West Middle School, Lizton, Indiana, USA
 DeSoto West Middle School (DeSoto, Texas), USA
 Franklin Township Middle School West, Indianapolis, Indiana, USA
 Wayzata West Middle School, Hennepin County, Minnesota, USA
 Portage West Middle School, Portage, Michigan, USA
 Gosforth West Middle School, Gosforth, Newcastle upon Tyne, England